If My Heart Had Windows is an album by American country music artist George Jones released in 1968 on the Musicor Records label.

Background
If My Heart Had Windows features two of the more bizarre songs in the Jones cannon: "Unwanted Babies" and "Poor Chinee".  The former, a protest song written for Jones by Earl "Peanut" Montgomery, appears to be Jones's half-hearted attempt to appear more socially conscious in the turbulent Vietnam War and Civil Rights era. As recounted in Rich Kienzle's 2016 book The Grand Tour, at least one account survives of DJ Ralph Emery playing "Unwanted Babies" when George visited his late-night show, and an upset and embarrassed George insisting, 'It's not me, Ralph! It's not me!" In the 1994 article "The Devil in George Jones", Nick Tosches observes that the sixties "were a strange time for Jones.  America was adrift in a fluorescent cloud of patchouli-scented ahimsa, and Jones, in his crew cut and his Nudie Cohn suits, seemed hopelessly out of sync.  He began to let his hair grow out a bit, and he and Pappy (Daily, Jones's producer) gave folk rock their best shot with “Unwanted Babies,” a garbled protest song...Combining his middle name and his mother's maiden name, he released the record under the pseudonym Glen Patterson.  'We did a certain type of song that we thought would sell at that time,' George said, taken aback at the mention of it. 'But it wasn't the type of song that I would have normally cut, and I just didn't want to use my real name.'"

The rest of the album, however, is pure Jones, whose voice and delivery had evolved into the more lucid, contemporary approach typical of the Nashville Sound of the sixties.  Both the title track and "Say It's Not You" would be top ten country hits. Jones would record "Say It's Not You" as a duet with Rolling Stone Keith Richards in 1992, with Richards writing in his memoir Life that country-rock pioneer and Jones fan Gram Parsons first made him aware of the song.  A bootleg of Richards singing "Your Angel Steps Out Of Heaven" is also widely available.  Johnny Paycheck sings the background vocals on the Jones version.  "Possum Holler" is a novelty song written by Dallas Frazier that makes light of the singer's famous nickname, which he received from dee jay Slim Watts while working at KRTM in Beaumont in the 1950s.

If My Heart Had Windows rose to number 13 on the country music album chart. In 1988, Patty Loveless recorded the song for her second album If My Heart Had Windows and the song was her first top ten hit.

Track listing 
 "If My Heart Had Windows" (Dallas Frazier)
 "Between My House and Town" (Sanger D. Shafer)
 "On Second Thought" (Charlie Carter)
 "Possum Holler" (Dallas Frazier)
 "Unwanted Babies" (Earl Montgomery)
 "Say It's Not You" (Dallas Frazier)
 "Wrong Side of the World" (Alex Zanetis)
 "Stranger's Me" (Dallas Frazier)
 "Your Angel Steps Out of Heaven" (Jack Ripley)
 "Poor Chinee" (Eddie Noack, V. Feuerbacher)

Personnel
The Jordanaires – vocal accompaniment

References

External links
 George Jones' Official Website

1968 albums
George Jones albums
Albums produced by Pappy Daily
Musicor Records albums